Harald von Musil (13 January 1908 – 1987) was an Austrian sailor. He competed at the 1948 Summer Olympics, the 1952 Summer Olympics and the 1960 Summer Olympics.

References

External links
 

1908 births
1987 deaths
Austrian male sailors (sport)
Olympic sailors of Austria
Sailors at the 1948 Summer Olympics – Firefly
Sailors at the 1952 Summer Olympics – Star
Sailors at the 1960 Summer Olympics – Star
Sportspeople from Vienna